The current flag of Sudan was adopted on 20 May 1970 and consists of a horizontal red-white-black tricolour with a green triangle at the hoist. The flag is based on the Arab Liberation Flag of the Egyptian Revolution of 1952, as are the flags of Egypt, Iraq, Syria, Yemen, and Palestine and formerly of the United Arab Republic, North Yemen, South Yemen, and the Libyan Arab Republic.

Whereas there is no fixed order for the Pan-Arab Colours of black, white, red, and green, flags using the Arab Liberation Colours (a subset of the Pan-Arab Colours) maintain a horizontal triband of equal stripes of red, white, and black, with green being used to distinguish the different flags from each other by way of green stars, Arabic script, or, in the case of Sudan, the green triangle along the hoist. In the original Arab Liberation Flag, green was used in the form of the flag of the Kingdom of Egypt and Sudan emblazoned on the breast of the Eagle of Saladin in the middle stripe. For 13 years from Sudan's independence in 1956 to the 1969 military coup of Gaafar Nimeiry, Sudan used a tricolour flag of blue-yellow-green.

Design

Symbolism 
According to World Flags 101:

Construction Sheet

Colors scheme

Government and armed forces flags

Government flags

Armed forces flags

Historical flags

Flag Of El-Mahadia 
In 1881, at the beginning of the El-Mahadia War, El-Mahadi Muhammad Ahmad appointed Abdallahi (altaeayushi) ibn Muhammad as one of his four caliphs (Khalifa) and handed him a black flag. Abdallahi used his black flag to recruit Baggara Arabs and other tribes from the west. The other caliphs used differently coloured flags. The black horizontal stripe in the current Sudanese flag is a reference to this Mahdist-era black flag.

Anglo-Egyptian Sudan 
Between 1899 and 1956, Anglo-Egyptian Sudan was administered jointly as a condominium by Egypt and the United Kingdom. The condominium did not have its own flag; instead the flag of Egypt and the flag of the United Kingdom were always flown together, with the British flag taking precedence.

A flag did exist as a rank flag for the British Governor General of the Sudan. In common with the rank flags of governors and commissioners of other British overseas territories, it consisted of a Union Flag defaced with a white disk bearing the territory's badge or coat of arms, surrounded by a wreath of laurel. As no badge or coat of arms existed for Anglo-Egyptian Sudan, the disk instead contained the words "GOVERNOR GENERAL OF THE SUDAN".

At the Afro–Asian Conference held between 18 and 24 April 1955, Sudan was represented by a white flag bearing the name "SUDAN" in red capital letters.

Republic of Sudan (1956–1969) 

Upon independence from Egypt and the United Kingdom on 1 January 1956, Sudan adopted a blue-yellow-green tricolour as its national flag. This flag was designed by the poet Macki Sufi and remained in use until 1970, when the current flag was adopted. The colours of the flag represented the River Nile (blue), the Sahara (yellow) and farmlands (green). They were chosen as they were neutral between ethnic groups and political parties.

Use of this flag resurfaced during the 2018–19 Sudanese protests.

Democratic Republic of the Sudan (1969–1985) 
Following a coup d'état in May 1969, the country was renamed the Democratic Republic of the Sudan and a competition was held to design a new flag. The winning entry was designed by artist Abdel Rahman Ahmed Al-Jali based on pan-Arab colors and was adopted as the national flag in May 1970.

Former provincial flags

Sub-national flags
Some of the states of Sudan have adopted their own distinctive flags. These usually consist of the state’s emblem displayed on a white or coloured background.

States

Administrative areas

See also 

 List of Sudanese flags
 Emblem of Sudan
 Flag of South Sudan
 Flag of Egypt
 Flag of Syria
 Flag of Iraq
 Flag of Yemen

References

External links 
 

Flags introduced in 1970
Flag
Flags of Africa
Sudan